Yekaterina Arabova (born August 10, 1983 in Ashgabat) is a Turkmenistan sport shooter. Arabova represented Turkmenistan at the 2008 Summer Olympics in Beijing, where she competed for the women's 10 m air rifle. She placed last out of forty-seven shooters in the qualifying rounds, with a score of 376 points.

References

External links
NBC 2008 Olympics profile

Turkmenistan female sport shooters
Living people
Olympic shooters of Turkmenistan
Shooters at the 2008 Summer Olympics
1983 births
Sportspeople from Ashgabat
Shooters at the 2002 Asian Games
Shooters at the 2010 Asian Games
Asian Games competitors for Turkmenistan